The A-3 Oricou (French for African vulture) was a small French touring airplane designed in 1927 by Georges Abrial. It could seat two, and was powered by a 30 kW (40 hp) piston engine.

Specifications (A-3 Oricou)

See also

Single-engined tractor aircraft
1920s French civil utility aircraft
Oricou